No. 81 (OTU) Group was a group within the Royal Air Force's Fighter Command during the Second World War and the post-war era.

The group was formed on 16 December 1940 at RAF Sealand as part of Fighter Command to control Operational Training Units. On 19 February 1941 it moved to Tallow Hall in Worcester and then on 22 December 1941 it was based at Avening Court in Gloucestershire.  It was disbanded on 15 April 1943 when all controlled units were moved to No. 9 Group.

The group was reformed on 1 Jan 1952 at RAF Watnall to control all training units within Fighter Command, on 16 May 1952 it moved to RAF Rudloe Manor. It was finally disbanded on 31 March 1958.

Organisation

1 January 1941

The group was organised as follows;
 Group Headquarters at Antumn Avenue, Worcester
No. 54 Operational Training Unit RAF at RAF Church Fenton with Blenheim & Beaufighter
No. 55 Operational Training Unit RAF at RAF Aston Down with Spitfire, Hurricane & Blenheim
No. 56 Operational Training Unit RAF at RAF Sutton Bridge with Hurricane
No. 57 Operational Training Unit RAF at RAF Hawarden with Spitfire
No. 58 Operational Training Unit RAF at RAF Grangemouth with Spitfire

1 May 1942

The group was organised as follows;
 Group Headquarters, RAF Avening Court, Stroud, Gloucestershire
No. 51 Operational Training Unit RAF at RAF Cranfield with Blenheim & Beaufighter
No. 52 Operational Training Unit RAF at RAF Aston Down with Spitfire
No. 53 Operational Training Unit RAF at RAF Llandow and RAF Rhoose with Spitfire
No. 54 Operational Training Unit RAF at RAF Charterhall and RAF Winfield with Blenheim & Beaufighter
No. 55 Operational Training Unit RAF at RAF Annan and RAF Longtown with Hurricane
No. 56 Operational Training Unit RAF at RAF Tealing and RAF Kinnell with Hurricane
No. 57 Operational Training Unit RAF at RAF Hawarden with Spitfire
No. 58 Operational Training Unit RAF at RAF Grangemouth and RAF Balado Bridge with Spitfire
No. 59 Operational Training Unit RAF at RAF Crosby on Eden and RAF Longtown with Hurricane
No. 60 Operational Training Unit RAF at RAF East Fortune and RAF Macmerry with Blenheim & Beaufighter
No. 61 Operational Training Unit RAF at RAF Rednal and RAF Montford Bridge with Spitfire

1 March 1943

The group was organised as follows;
 Group Headquarters, RAF Avening Court, Stroud, Gloucestershire
No. 41 Operational Training Unit RAF at RAF Hawarden and RAF Poulton with Mustang & Hurricane
No. 51 Operational Training Unit RAF at RAF Cranfield and RAF Twinwood Farm with Blenheim & Beaufighter
No. 52 Operational Training Unit RAF at RAF Aston Down with Spitfire
No. 53 Operational Training Unit RAF at RAF Llandow and RAF Rhoose with Spitfire
No. 54 Operational Training Unit RAF at RAF Charterhall and RAF Winfield with Blenheim & Beaufighter
No. 55 Operational Training Unit RAF at RAF Annan and RAF Longtown with Hurricane
No. 56 Operational Training Unit RAF at RAF Tealing and RAF Kinnell with Hurricane and Spitfire
No. 57 Operational Training Unit RAF at RAF Eshott and RAF Boulmer with Spitfire
No. 58 Operational Training Unit RAF at RAF Grangemouth and RAF Balado Bridge with Spitfire
No. 59 Operational Training Unit RAF at RAF Milfield, RAF Brunton and RAF Boulmer with Hurricane
No. 61 Operational Training Unit RAF at RAF Rednal and RAF Montford Bridge with Spitfire
No. 62 Operational Training Unit RAF at RAF Usworth with Anson

Commanders

1940 to 1943
16 December 1940 - Air Commodore F J Vincent
29 July 1942 - Air Commodore W H Dunn

1952 to 1958
1 January 1952 - Air Commodore L W C Bower
January 1954 - Air Commodore C C McMullen
19 February 1954 - Vacant
2 April 1954 - Air Commodore H A V Hogan
15 August 1955 - Air Commodore R C Mead

References

Citations

Bibliography

081
081
Training units and formations of the Royal Air Force
Military units and formations established in 1940
Military units and formations disestablished in 1958